The 1939 Tennessee Volunteers represented the University of Tennessee in the 1939 college football season. Playing as a member of the Southeastern Conference (SEC), the team was led by head coach Robert Neyland, in his 13th year, and played their home games at Shields–Watkins Field in Knoxville, Tennessee. They finished the season with a record of ten wins and one loss (10–1 overall, 6–0 in the SEC), as SEC Champions and with a loss against USC in the 1940 Rose Bowl.

Tennessee entered the season as defending national champions and coach Neyland led the team to their second of three consecutive undefeated regular seasons. The 1939 Vols were also the last team in NCAA history to go undefeated, untied, and unscored upon in the regular season.  Tennessee had two All-American performers that year: George Cafego, a single-wing halfback, and Ed Molinski, a guard.

Schedule

References

Tennessee
Tennessee Volunteers football seasons
Southeastern Conference football champion seasons
Tennessee Volunteers football